This is a list of numbered roads in the United Counties of Stormont, Dundas and Glengarry, Ontario. 

Stormont, Dundas and Glengarry